Afrodontomyia is a genus of flies in the family Stratiomyidae.

Species
Afrodontomyia apicalis James, 1952
Afrodontomyia erecta (Brunetti, 1926)
Afrodontomyia flammiventris (Brunetti, 1926)
Afrodontomyia gigas (Brunetti, 1926)
Afrodontomyia gracilis (Curran, 1928)
Afrodontomyia rufiventris (Curran, 1928)
Afrodontomyia rufoabdominalis (Brunetti, 1913)
Afrodontomyia seminuda (Curran, 1928)
Afrodontomyia titan James, 1952

References

Stratiomyidae
Brachycera genera
Diptera of Africa
Diptera of Asia